In Spain, a Semana Negra ("black week") is a literary festival that celebrates crime fiction and detective stories with a variety of events for literature, cinema, theater, photography and gastronomy.

Aragonegro 
The Aragon festival was first held in 2014. It was supported by Fundación Caja Rural de Aragón, Cafés Orús, the city of Zaragoza, and private sponsors.

Barcelona Negra 
Barcelona Negra, better known as BCNegra was conceived in 2005 and has been held every year since 2006.

Castelló Negre 

This festival is known officially and in Valencia as the Castelló Negre, and also called the Castellón Negro. It began in 2010.

Collbató Negre 

Collbató Negre

Getafe Negro 

In Madrid, the Getafe Negro began in 2008.

Granada Noir 

The Andalucían festival was first held in 2015 and will include the award of the first Granada Noir prize.

Pamplona Negra 

Pamplona Negra

Semana Negra de Gijón 
Semana Negra de Gijón began in 1988. It initially dealt only with crime fiction but has expanded to other genres including science fiction, fantasy and historical fiction.

Valencia Negra 
Officially known as the  Festival de género negro de Valencia

References

External links 
 web site

Literary festivals in Spain
Crime fiction